This is a list of solar eclipses in the 17th century. During the period 1601 to 1700 there were 248 solar eclipses of which 89 were partial, 74 were annular, 61 were total (one non-central), and 24 were hybrids. The greatest number of eclipses in one year was four, occurring in 16 different years: 1613, 1620, 1624, 1631, 1638, 1642, 1649, 1653, 1660, 1667, 1671, 1678, 1685, 1689, 1693, and 1696. Two months, May 1631 and May 1696, had two eclipses.

References

 
17th century-related lists
+17